Kausar Mohammed is an American actress, comedian, writer, and voice actress. She is best known for her roles in East of La Brea, What Men Want, Little and voicing Yasmina 'Yaz' Fadoula in Netflix's Jurassic World Camp Cretaceous.

Life and career
She graduated from UCLA and was a member of the UCLA Spring Sing Company. She has worked on and written many digital projects, such as "Smyle" and "Namaste" featured on Huffington Post, and NBC. She is also California's Census Campaign Digital Ambassador.

Kausar also voices series lead characters on the anime show Great Pretender, and the Netflix animated series Jurassic World Camp Cretaceous.

In July 2022, Nickelodeon announced that Kausar would voice the character Cleo de Nile in the 2022 animated reboot series Monster High.

Personal life
A queer Muslim of Pakistani ancestry, she has been active in striving to gain visibility for LGBT+ Muslims.

Filmography

References

External links
 

Living people
21st-century American actresses
American voice actresses
American stand-up comedians
American women comedians
American television actresses
American film actresses
American people of Pakistani descent
American Muslims
LGBT Muslims
American queer actresses
Queer women
1992 births